Tic&Tac is the eighth album of the Jazz fusion band Area and was released in 1980. It is the first album without Demetrio Stratos as he died a year earlier, and it is generally more jazzy than progressive. This is the only album in which  performs. After releasing this, Area toured until 1983, then disbanded.  in 1986 formed a jazz fusion band called Area II, but was the only original member. Area reformed officially in 1993 with a concert in Rome, as a trio, with Ares Tavolazzi,  and Capiozzo. However, they didn't record anything new in studio until 1997 when the album "Chernobyl 7991" was released (without Tavolazzi). This album is completely instrumental, save for the final track "Antes de Hablar Abra la Boca".

Track listing

Side one

 "La Torre Dell'Alchimista" (Fariselli) – 5:50
 "Danza ad Anello" (Fariselli) – 5:13
 "A.S.A." (Fariselli) – 4:34
 "Lectric Rag" (Fariselli) – 1:50
 "La Luna Nel Pozzo" (Fariselli) – 3:41

Side two

 "Tic & Tac" (Fariselli) – 4:38
 "Quartet" (Tavolazzi) – 2:12
 "Sibarotega" (Fariselli) – 4:16
 "Chantee D'Amour" (Tavolazzi) – 4:47
 "Antes de Hablar Abra la Boca" (Fariselli) – 4:22

Personnel
Patrizio Fariselli – acoustic piano, M.C.S. 70 synthesizer and electric piano
Larry Nocella – tenor sax
Giulio Capiozzo – drums
Ares Tavolazzi – electric bass, double bass, guitar

Guest musicians

Guido Guidoboni – trumpet in "Danza ad anello" and "Sibarotega"
Luciano Biasutti – trumpet in "Antes de Hablar Abra la Boca"
Pino Vicari  – voice in "Antes de Hablar Abra la Boca"

References

1980 albums
Area (band) albums